, is a Japanese footballer currently playing as a forward for YSCC Yokohama.

Club career
Hidaka made his professional debut in a 1–8 Emperor's Cup loss against Kashima Antlers.

Personal life
Born in Japan, Hidaka is of Beninese descent.

Career statistics

Club
.

Notes

References

External links

2000 births
Living people
Association football people from Kagoshima Prefecture
Japanese footballers
Japanese people of Beninese descent
Association football forwards
YSCC Yokohama players